Smoky Lake is an alpine lake in Blaine County, Idaho, United States, located in the Smoky Mountains in Sawtooth National Forest. While no trails lead to the lake, it is most easily accessed from the end of forest road 170. The lake is located just southeast of Prairie Creek Peak. It is also near Little Lost Lake, Big Lost Lake, and Upper and Lower Norton lakes.

References

Lakes of Idaho
Lakes of Blaine County, Idaho
Glacial lakes of the United States
Glacial lakes of the Sawtooth National Forest